The North Bay Bohemian is a weekly newspaper published in the  North Bay subregion of the San Francisco Bay Area, in California, United States. The newspaper is distributed in Sonoma and Napa counties.

The newspaper began publication in 1979 as The Paper in the Guerneville area of western Sonoma County by artist turned community journalist Nick Valentine and jazz pianist Bob Lucas. Elizabeth Poole bought the struggling publication with family money shortly after its 1979 debut and owned it until its 1990 purchase by John Boland and James Carroll.

The Paper was renamed the Sonoma County Independent in 1993 and published every other week under Boland and Carroll, who moved its offices to Santa Rosa. In 1994 the Independent was purchased by Weeklys, an independent group of three Bay Area alternative weeklies, and the publication frequency was changed to weekly.

In 2000, the newspaper was rebranded as the North Bay Bohemian and the circulation area was expanded to Marin and Napa counties. In 2015, Weeklys acquired the Pacific Sun, which covered Marin County, and the Bohemian withdrew from Marin County.

In September 2018, Stett Holbrook resigned as the publication's editor-in-chief. In fall of 2019, longtime contributor Daedalus Howell became the editor.

Logo
The Bohemians logo was originally designed by graphic designer Martin Venezky and later refined by typographer Jim Parkinson. It was based on the 19th Century wedge serif typeface Saracen as redrawn by Jonathan Hoefler.

Awards
The Bohemian has won numerous awards for its work.
 California Journalism Awards (formerly Better Newspapers Contest):
Investigative Journalism, Second place, 2021
 Agricultural Reporting, Second place, 2021
 In-depth reporting, Second place, 2021
Investigative Journalism, First place, 2019
Editorial Comment, First place, 2013
Investigative Journalism, second place, 2013
Special Section, Blue Ribbon Finalist (Best Of issue), 2013
Arts & Entertainment, second place, 2012
Best Feature Story, second place, 2012
 Awards from the Association of Alternative Newsweeklies:
Music criticism, first place, 2012
Best blog, first place, 2010
Best special section (Best of the North Bay), second place, 2010
Food writing (2008, 2007 and 2006)
Including first place in 2007: Food Writing, for Swirl 'n' Spit by Daedalus Howell
 Special section (2009 and 2008)
 Music criticism (2005 and 2004)
 Photography (1999)
 Illustration (1998)
 For investigative journalism:
 2008 Project Censored Top 25 for Dianne Feinstein: A Question of Ethics by Peter Byrne This series was also a finalist for an award from the Investigative Reporters and Editors association.
Bohemian reporters Peter Byrne and Will Carruthers won the 2020 James Madison Freedom of Information Award in the Professional Journalist category from the Society of Professional Journalists' NorCal Chapter for Charity Case: Investigating PG&E-funded Rebuild North Bay Foundation.
 First Place, Investigative Reporting, 2019, California Journalism Awards: Charity Case: Investigating PG&E-funded Rebuild North Bay Foundation,Peter Byrne, Will Carruthers 

Charity Case

References

1999 Lincoln Steffens Award for investigative journalism for coverage of deaths of inmates at the Sonoma County Jail

Newspapers published in the San Francisco Bay Area
Alternative weekly newspapers published in the United States
Newspapers established in 1979
Mass media in Sonoma County, California
1979 establishments in California
Weekly newspapers published in California